Kevin Hart: Zero F**ks Given is a 2020 American stand-up comedy special by comedian Kevin Hart. According to Hart the special, which was shot in his living room, is going to be "like no other" having "zero filter" and making "zero apologies." In it, he touches on topics such as group chats with male friends, sex after 40, and dealing with life during the COVID-19 pandemic.

The special was released on Netflix on November 17, 2020.

References

External links 

2020 films
2020 comedy films
American comedy films
2020s English-language films
Films about the COVID-19 pandemic
Films directed by Leslie Small
Netflix specials
2020s American films